The Roman Catholic Metropolitan Archdiocese of Perth is a Latin Church metropolitan archdiocese of the Catholic Church in Australia covering the Greater Perth, Goldfields-Esperance, Peel and Wheatbelt regions of Western Australia.

St Mary's Cathedral located in Perth, Western Australia, is the seat of the Catholic Metropolitan Archbishop of Perth, currently Timothy Costelloe, appointed in February 2012.

History 
On 6 May 1845 the Diocese of Perth was erected in an  area covered and administered previously by the Archdiocese of Sydney.

It lost territory repeatedly, to establish on 12 March 1867 the Benedictine Territorial Abbacy of New Norcia, on 10 May 1887 the Apostolic Vicariate of Kimberley in Western Australia and on 30 January 1898 the Roman Catholic Diocese of Geraldton.

It was elevated as Metropolitan archdiocese on 29 August 1913.

On 12 November 1954 it lost territory to establish the Roman Catholic Diocese of Bunbury.

In 1982 it regained former territory from the suppressed Territorial Abbacy of New Norcia.

Cathedral 

The Cathedral of the Immaculate Conception of the Blessed Virgin Mary, commonly called St Mary's Cathedral, is the seat of the archbishop and is located in East Perth.

During restoration work in the cathedral between 2003 and 2006, the brick and plaster crypt containing the coffins of bishops Matthew Gibney and Martin Griver was discovered by archaeologists under the floorboards of an aisle in the cathedral.

In 2011, the remains of Perth's first bishop, John Brady, were exhumed from his grave in France and he was laid to rest in the crypt.

Province 
Its Roman Catholic Ecclesiastical Province of Perth includes for the suffragan dioceses of Broome and Perth's two daughter-bishoprics, Bunbury and Geraldton.

Bishops

Episcopal incumbents 

The following individuals have been elected as Roman Catholic Archbishop of Perth, or any of its precursor titles:
Diocesan suffragan bishops
{| class="wikitable"
!Order
!Name
!Title
!Date installed
!Ministry ended
!Term of office
!Reason for term end
|-
|align="center"| ||John Brady † ||Bishop of Perth ||align="center" |9 May 1845 ||align="center" |3 December 1871^ ||align="right"| ||Died in office
|-
|rowspan=2 align="center"| ||rowspan=2 |Martin Griver † ||Apostolic Administrator of Perth ||align="center" |1 October 1869 ||align="center" |22 July 1873 ||align="right"| ||Succeeded as Bishop of Perth
|-
|Bishop of Perth ||align="center" |22 July 1873  ||align="center" |1 November 1886 ||align="right"| ||Died in office
|-
|rowspan=2 align="center"| ||rowspan=2 |Matthew Gibney † ||Coadjutor Bishop of Perth ||align="center" |28 September 1886  ||align="center" |1 November 1886 ||align="right"| days ||Succeeded as Bishop of Perth
|-
|Bishop of Perth ||align="center" |1 November 1886 ||align="center" |14 May 1910 ||align="right"| ||Resigned and appointed Bishop Emeritus of Perth
|-
|rowspan=2 align="center"| ||rowspan=2 |Patrick Clune, CSsR † ||Bishop of Perth  ||align="center" |21 December 1910 ||align="center" |28 August 1913 ||align="right"| ||Elevated as Archbishop of Perth
|-
|}
^ = Bishop John Brady was suspended from his functions motu proprio in October 1851 by Pope Pius IX and Joseph Serra appointed as coadjutor bishop of Perth, reporting to the Archbishop of Sydney. Brady retained the title Bishop of Perth, although living in exile from his Diocese, until his death. Serra served as Coadjutor Bishop and Temporal Administrator of Perth from 1849 to 1851, Apostolic Administrator from 1851 to 1862. Rosendo Salvado was appointed Coadjutor Bishop of Perth for three years from 1853 while Serra was absent in Europe.

Metropolitan Archbishops
{| class="wikitable"
!Order
!Name
!Title
!Date installed
!Ministry ended
!Term of office
!Reason for term end
|-
|align="center"| |||Patrick Clune, CSsR †||Archbishop of Perth ||align="center" |28 August 1913 ||align="center" |24 May 1935 ||align="right"| ||Died in office
|-
|rowspan=2 align="center"| ||rowspan=2 |Redmond Prendiville † ||Coadjutor Archbishop of Perth  ||align="center" |11 July 1933 ||align="center" |24 May 1935 ||align="right"| ||Elevated as Archbishop of Perth
|-
|Archbishop of Perth ||align="center" |24 May 1935 ||align="center" |28 June 1968 ||align="right"| ||Died in office
|-
|align="center"| ||Launcelot Goody † ||Archbishop of Perth  ||align="center" |18 October 1968 ||align="center" |26 October 1983 ||align="right"| ||Retired and appointed Archbishop Emeritus of Perth
|-
|align="center"| ||William Foley † ||Archbishop of Perth ||align="center" |26 October 1983 ||align="center" |10 February 1991 ||align="right"| ||Died in office
|-
|align="center"| |||Barry Hickey ||Archbishop of Perth ||align="center" |23 July 1991 ||align="center" |20 February 2012 ||align="right"| ||Retired and appointed Archbishop Emeritus of Perth
|-
|align="center"| |||Timothy Costelloe,  ||Archbishop of Perth ||align="center" |20 February 2012 ||align="center" |present ||align="right"| ||incumbent
|-
|}

Coadjutor and auxiliary bishops 

Current
 Donald George Sproxton – Appointed auxiliary bishop 12 December 2001, Titular Bishop of Timici

Former
 Coadjutor Bishop Joseph Serra y Juliá, O.S.B. † (7 August 1849 – 7 January 1862)
 Coadjutor Bishop Matthew Gibney † (28 September 1886 – 1 November 1886), Titular Bishop of Hippus (1886.09.28 – 1 November 1886)
 Coadjutor Archbishop Redmond Prendiville † (11 July 1933 – 24 May 1935 see above), Titular Archbishop of Cypsela (11 July 1933 – 24 May 1935)
 Auxiliary Bishop Launcelot John Goody (later Archbishop) † (2 August 1951 – 12 November 1954 see above), Titular Bishop of Abydus (2 August 1951 – 12 November 1954), later Bishop of Bunbury (Australia) (12 November 1954 – 18 October 1968)
 Auxiliary Bishop John Joseph Rafferty † (12 June 1955 – 6 January 1962)
 Auxiliary Bishop Myles McKeon † (23 May 1962 – 6 March 1969)
 Auxiliary Bishop Peter Quinn † (26 June 1969 – 26 May 1982)
 Auxiliary Bishop Robert Healy † (2 October 1975 – 25 October 2000)

Other priests of the diocese who became bishops
John O’Reilly †, appointed Bishop of Port Augusta in 1887
William Bernard Kelly †, appointed Vicar Apostolic of Kimberley in Western Australia in 1894; appointed	Bishop of Geraldton in 1898: consecrated bishop in 1898
Justin Joseph Bianchini, appointed Bishop of Geraldton in 1992
Gerard Joseph Holohan, appointed Bishop of Bunbury in 2001
Max Leroy Davis, appointed Bishop of Australia, Military in 2003
† = deceased

Parishes 
The archdiocese is divided into three separate deaneries that administer individual parishes covering inner metropolitan Perth, outer metropolitan Perth, and country parishes and church centres (with churches dedicated the saints as indicated).

Inner metropolitan Perth

The inner metropolitan deanery covers the cathedral parish of Perth (St Mary); and parishes located in Applecross (St Benedict's), Attadale (St Joseph Pignatelli), Balcatta (St Lawrence and Mary Immaculate), Ballajura (St Mary Mackillop), Bassendean (St Joseph), Bateman (St Thomas More), Bayswater (St Columba), Beaconsfield (Christ the King), Bentley (Santa Clara), Canning Vale (St Emilie de Vialar), Carlisle (Holy Name), City Beach (Holy Spirit), Claremont (St Thomas the Apostle), Cloverdale, (Notre Dame), Como (Holy Family), Cottesloe/Mosman Park (St Mary Star of the Sea), Dianella (Our Lady's Assumption), Doubleview (Our Lady of the Rosary), East Fremantle (Immaculate Conception), East Victoria Park (Our Lady Help of Christians), Embleton (Holy Trinity), Floreat (St Cecilia), Fremantle (St Patrick's Basilica), Girrawheen (Our Lady of Mercy), Glendalough (St Bernadette), Hamilton Hill (Holy Cross), Highgate (Sacred Heart), Hilton (Our Lady of Mount Carmel), Joondanna (St Denis), Innaloo/Karrinyup (St Dominic), Leederville (St Mary), Lynwood (St Jude), Lockridge (Good Shepherd), Manning (St Pius X), Maylands (Queen of Martyrs), Morley (Infant Jesus), Mirrabooka (St Gerald Majella), Mt Lawley (St Paul), Myaree (Pater Noster), Nedlands (Holy Rosary), Nollamara (Our Lady of Lourdes), North Beach (Our Lady of Grace), Northbridge (St Brigid), Osborne Park (St Kieran), Palmyra (Our Lady of Fatima), Queens Park (St Joseph), Riverton (Our Lady Queen of Apostles), Rivervale (St Augustine), Scarborough (Immaculate Heart of Mary), Shenton Park (St Aloysius), South Perth (St Columba), Subiaco (St Joseph), Victoria Park (St Joachim), Willetton (Saints John and Paul), and Wilson (Our Lady of Perpetual Help).

Outer metropolitan Perth
The Outer metropolitan deanery covers parishes located in Armadale (St Francis Xavier), Baldivis (Tranby College Chapel), Clarkson (St Andrew), Ellenbrook (St Helena of the Holy Cross), Gosnells (Our Lady of the Most Blessed Sacrament), Greenmount (St Anthony), Greenwood (All Saints), Guildford (St Mary), Kalamunda (Holy Family), Kelmscott (Good Shepherd), Kwinana (St Vincent), Lesmurdie (Our Lady of Lourdes), Maddington (Holy Family), Maida Vale (St Francis of Assissi), Midland (St Brigid), Mundaring (Sacred Heart), Ocean Reef (St Simon Peter), Pickering Brook (Our Lady of Grace), Port Kennedy (St Bernadette), Rockingham (Our Lady of Lourdes), Spearwood (St Jerome), Thornlie (Sacred Heart), Wanneroo (St Anthony of Padua), Whitford (Our Lady of the Mission), Woodvale (St Luke), Yanchep (Guilderton Community Hall), and Yangebup (Mater Christi).

See also 

 Roman Catholicism in Australia
 List of Roman Catholic archdioceses#Oceania

References

Further reading

Sources and external links

 GigaCatholic with incumbent biography links
 Catholic Archdiocese of Perth

.
Perth, Roman Catholic Archdiocese of
Religion in Perth, Western Australia
1845 establishments in Australia
Religious organizations established in 1845
Roman Catholic dioceses and prelatures established in the 19th century